Albert Edwards may refer to:
Albert Edwards (footballer) (flourished 1910s, died 1918), English footballer
Albert Gallatin Edwards (1812–1892), American businessman and Assistant Secretary of the U.S. Treasury
Turk Edwards (Albert Glen Edwards, 1907–1973), American football tackle and coach

See also
Al Edwards (disambiguation)
Bert Edwards (disambiguation)